Gauff may refer to:

 Coco Gauff (born 2004), American tennis player
 Gauff Hill, incorporated community in Pennsylvania, US
Gauff-Roth House, historic house in Pennsylvania, US